Mariya Filipova (born ) is a Bulgarian female volleyball player. She is a member of the Bulgaria women's national volleyball team and played for Metal Galați in 2008. 

She was part of the Bulgarian national team at the 2014 FIVB Volleyball Women's World Championship in Italy, and at the 2009 Women's European Volleyball Championship.

Clubs
 CSKA SOFIA (1997-2001)
 Levski Volley (2001-2004)
 Fakel Novy Ourengoï (2004-2005)
 Hainaut Volley (2005-2006)
 RC Cannes (2006-2007)
 Panellinios Athènes (2007-2008)
 Metal Galați (2008-2009)
 Lokomotiv Baku (2009-2014)
 Volley 2002 Forlì (2014-2015)
 Telekom Baku (2015-2017)

References

1982 births
Living people
Bulgarian women's volleyball players
Place of birth missing (living people)
European Games competitors for Bulgaria
Volleyball players at the 2015 European Games
Liberos
Expatriate volleyball players in Russia
Expatriate volleyball players in France
Expatriate volleyball players in Greece
Expatriate volleyball players in Romania
Expatriate volleyball players in Azerbaijan
Expatriate volleyball players in Italy
Bulgarian expatriates in Russia
Bulgarian expatriate sportspeople in France
Bulgarian expatriates in Greece
Bulgarian expatriate sportspeople in Romania
Bulgarian expatriate sportspeople in Azerbaijan
Bulgarian expatriates in Italy